The 1953 Oklahoma Sooners football team represented the University of Oklahoma during the 1953 college football season. Led by seventh-year head coach Bud Wilkinson, they played their home games at Oklahoma Memorial Stadium in Norman, Oklahoma, and were members of the Big Seven Conference.

Schedule

Roster
G J.D. Roberts, Sr.
 E Carl Allison, Jr.

Rankings

Postseason

NFL Draft
The following players were drafted into the National Football League following the season.

References

Oklahoma
Oklahoma Sooners football seasons
Big Eight Conference football champion seasons
Orange Bowl champion seasons
Oklahoma Sooners football